Walter Perry (July 6, 1915 – March 1980) was an American Negro league catcher in the 1940s.

A native of Oakland, Florida, Perry played for the Homestead Grays in 1940. He died in his hometown of Oakland in 1980 at age 64.

References

External links
 and Seamheads

1915 births
1980 deaths
Homestead Grays players
Baseball catchers
Baseball players from Florida
People from Orange County, Florida
20th-century African-American sportspeople